In enzymology, a propanoyl-CoA C-acyltransferase is an enzyme that catalyzes the chemical reaction

3alpha,7alpha,12alpha-trihydroxy-5beta-cholanoyl-CoA + propanoyl-CoA  CoA + 3alpha,7alpha,12alpha-trihydroxy-24-oxo-5beta-cholestanoyl-CoA

Thus, the two substrates of this enzyme are 3alpha,7alpha,12alpha-trihydroxy-5beta-cholanoyl-CoA and propanoyl-CoA, whereas its two products are CoA and 3alpha,7alpha,12alpha-trihydroxy-24-oxo-5beta-cholestanoyl-CoA.

This enzyme belongs to the family of transferases, specifically those acyltransferases transferring groups other than aminoacyl groups.  The systematic name of this enzyme class is 3alpha,7alpha,12alpha-trihydroxy-5beta-cholanoyl-CoA:propanoyl-CoA C-acyltransferase. Other names in common use include peroxisomal thiolase 2, sterol carrier protein-, SCP, and PTE-2 (ambiguous).  This enzyme participates in ppar signaling pathway.

Propanoyl-CoA C-acyltransferase belongs to the thiolase family of enzymes.

References

 
 
 
 

EC 2.3.1
Enzymes of unknown structure